On August 16, 2003, at about 4 a.m. local time, a wildfire started via lightning strike near Rattlesnake Island in Okanagan Mountain Provincial Park, British Columbia, Canada. The wildfire was fuelled by a constant wind and the driest summer on record up to that time. Within a few days it grew into a firestorm.

The fire spread northward and eastward, initially threatening a small number of lakeshore homes, but quickly became an interface zone fire and forced the evacuation of 27,000 residents, consuming 239 homes. The final size of the firestorm was over 250 square kilometres. Most of the trees in Okanagan Mountain Park burned, and the park was closed.

60 fire departments, 1,400 armed forces troops and 1,000 forest fire fighters took part in controlling the fire, but were largely incapable of stopping the disaster.

There were also a number of aircraft used in an attempt to extinguish the fire, including three private Canadair CL-215s, four Government of Alberta owned Canadair CL-215s, four private Lockheed L188 Electra air tankers and at least one Martin Mars air tanker. Amateur radio operators assisted during the emergency. 

That total cost was estimated at $33.8 million.

Links to news articles

See also 
 Operation Peregrine
 List of fires in Canada
 List of disasters in Canada

References

External links 
  Photographs of housing sites a few weeks after the fire, in September and October, 2003.  Dr. Denis Wall Copyright.
  – Firewatch page set up for local residents during the fire (has many photos)
 NASA/JPL satellite image of fires in Northwestern North America August 21, 2003 (1800x1500px)

2003 08 16
2003 wildfires
2003 in British Columbia
Natural disasters in British Columbia
History of the Okanagan
2003 disasters in Canada